Brigadier-General  Christopher Robert Ingham Brooke,  (4 July 1869 – 28 December 1948) was a British soldier and Conservative MP for Pontefract from 1924 to 1929.

He was born in Thornhill, Yorkshire in 1869, the son of Ingham Brooke, and was educated at Winchester College.

Brooke was a major when he fought in the Second Boer War, where he was in command of 2nd Mounted infantry, which in 1902 was based in the Transvaal Colony. He later fought in the First World War, and received the DSO in 1915. He was made a Companion of the Order of St Michael and St George in the 1917 New Year Honours, and retired as brigadier-general.

From 1924 to 1935 Brooke was Honorary Colonel of the 5th Battalion, King's Own Yorkshire Light Infantry. He died at George, Cape Province, South Africa in 1948.

References

External links 
 

1869 births
1948 deaths
British Army brigadiers
Conservative Party (UK) MPs for English constituencies
UK MPs 1924–1929
British Army personnel of the Second Boer War
British Army personnel of World War I
King's Own Yorkshire Light Infantry officers
Companions of the Order of St Michael and St George
Companions of the Distinguished Service Order
People educated at Winchester College
People from Thornhill, West Yorkshire